John Griffin "Stumpy" Thomason (February 24, 1906 – April 30, 1989) was a professional American football player who played running back for seven seasons for the Brooklyn Dodgers and Philadelphia Eagles. He played college football for the 1928 national champion Georgia Tech Yellow Jackets football team, in the backfield with Warner Mizell. Thomason was All-Southern in 1927.

References

External links
 Stumpy Thomason's obituary
 

1906 births
1989 deaths
Players of American football from Atlanta
American football running backs
Brooklyn Dodgers (NFL) players
Georgia Tech Yellow Jackets football players
Philadelphia Eagles players
All-Southern college football players